The Walrus HULA (Hybrid Ultra Large Aircraft) project was a DARPA-funded experiment to create an airship capable of traveling up to 12,000 nautical miles (about 22,000 km) in range, while carrying 500-1000 tons of air cargo. In distinct contrast to earlier generation airships, the Walrus HULA would be a heavier-than-air vehicle and would generate lift through a combination of aerodynamics, thrust vectoring, and gas buoyancy generation and management.

DARPA said advances in envelope and hull materials, buoyancy and lift control, drag reduction and propulsion combined to make this concept feasible. Technologies to be investigated in the initial study phase included vacuum/air buoyancy compensator tanks, which provide buoyancy control without ballast, and electrostatic atmospheric ion propulsion.

The WALRUS could potentially expand and speed the strategic airlift capability of the United States substantially while simultaneously reducing costs. A smaller scale demonstration was scheduled for 2008, when a small scale version of the WALRUS designed to carry only the capacity of a C-130 Hercules (i.e., 18,000 kg or about 40,000 lbs) was expected to fly.

The project was cancelled in 2010.

See also 

 P-791
 Aeroscraft
 CargoLifter
 Hybrid airship

References

Sources 
 Defense Industry Daily (Oct 21/05) - US Congressional Budget Office Gives OK to HULA Airships for Airlift
 
 Defense Industry Daily (July 6/05) - USAF Looking at Near-Space Blimps

External links 
 aeroscraft.com

Airships of the United States
DARPA
United States cargo aircraft